Cryptolepis is a plant genus in the family Apocynaceae. It includes some 42 species.

Selected species
Cryptolepis africana (Bullock) Venter & R.L.Verh.
Cryptolepis albicans Jum. & H.Perrier
Cryptolepis angolensis Welw. ex Hiern
Cryptolepis apiculata K.Schum.
Cryptolepis arbuscula (Radcl.-Sm.) Venter
Cryptolepis baumii N.E.Br.
Cryptolepis brazzaei Baill.
Cryptolepis buchanani
Cryptolepis buxifolia Chiov.
Cryptolepis capensis Schltr.
Cryptolepis cryptolepioides (Schltr.) Bullock
Cryptolepis dubia (Burm.f.) M.R.Almeida
Cryptolepis hypoglauca
Cryptolepis oblongifolia (Meisn.) Schltr.
Cryptolepis obtusa
Cryptolepis ruspolii Chiov.
Cryptolepis sanguinolenta (Lindl.) Schltr.
Cryptolepis sinensis (Lour.) Merr.
Cryptolepis sizenandii Rolfe
Cryptolepis socotrana (Balf.f.) Venter
Cryptolepis somaliensis Venter & Thulin
Cryptolepis stefianinii Chiov.
Cryptolepis suffruticosa N.E.Br.
Cryptolepis triangularis 
Cryptolepis volubilis (Balf.f.) O.Schwartz
Cryptolepis welwitschii Hiern
Cryptolepis yemenensis Venter & R.L.Verh.

Excluded or synonymous taxa
 C. buchananii, a synonym for C. dubia (Burm.f.) M.R.Almeida
 C. elegans, a synonym for C. sinensis (Lour.) Merr.
 C. edithae, a synonym for C. sinensis (Lour.) Merr.

References

 Farr, E. R. and Zijlstra, G. eds. (1996-) Index Nominum Genericorum (Plantarum). 2009 Aug 24 [1].
 Flora of China (2008). 'eFloras. Missouri Botanical Garden, St. Louis, MO & Harvard University Herbaria, Cambridge, MA. 2009 Aug 21 [2].
 USDA, ARS, National Genetic Resources Program. Germplasm Resources Information Network - (GRIN) [Online Database]. National Germplasm Resources Laboratory, Beltsville, Maryland. [3] (25 August 2009)

External links
	

Periplocoideae
Apocynaceae genera
Taxa named by Robert Brown (botanist, born 1773)